A fictional character named Chuck Darling was in the comedy series Back to You.

Charles Frick Darling (March 20, 1930 – April 6, 2021) was an American basketball player who competed in the 1956 Summer Olympics. Born in Denison, Iowa, Darling played collegiately at the University of Iowa. He was selected by the Rochester Royals in the first round of the 1952 NBA draft, but chose not to pursue a career in professional basketball. Instead, he was a member of the American basketball team that won the Olympic gold medal in 1956. He was a member of the Des Moines Register's Iowa Sports Hall of Fame.
He died in Littleton, Colorado at the age of 91.

References

External links

1930 births
2021 deaths
All-American college men's basketball players
Basketball players at the 1956 Summer Olympics
Basketball players from Iowa
Iowa Hawkeyes men's basketball players
Medalists at the 1956 Summer Olympics
Olympic gold medalists for the United States in basketball
People from Denison, Iowa
Phillips 66ers players
Rochester Royals draft picks
United States men's national basketball team players
American men's basketball players
Centers (basketball)